Sarolangun Regency is a regency of Jambi Province, Indonesia. It is located on the island of Sumatra. The regency has an area of 6,184 km2 and had a population of 246,245 at the 2010 census, 277,733 at the 2015 census and 290,047 at the 2020 census. The administrative centre is at the town of Sarolangun.

Administrative districts
Sarolangun Regency comprises ten districts, tabulated below with their areas and their populations at the 2010 census and 2020 census. The table also includes the locations of the district administrative centres, the number of administrative villages (rural  and urban ) in each district, and its post code.

References

Regencies of Jambi